Jérôme Pernoo (born 1972) is a French contemporary cellist.

Biography 
Jérôme Pernoo learned to play the cello with Germaine Fleury then Xavier Gagnepain. After his studies at the Conservatoire de Paris with Philippe Muller, he obtained the 3rd prize of the Concours de violoncelle Rostropovitch in Paris in 1994 and won the Pretoria competition en 1996.

Jérôme Pernoo has performed with most major French and foreign orchestras. He plays in recitals with pianist , on some of the most prestigious musical scenes such as the Wigmore Hall in London, the Théâtre du Châtelet, the Théâtre des Champs-Élysées or la Cité de la musique in Paris.

In September 2008, he premiered the cello concerto that Guillaume Connesson dedicated to him, with the Rouen Philharmonic Orchestra under the direction of Jérémie Rhorer.

In 2013, he was invited to the Carnegie Hall of New York City and the following year to the Berliner Philharmonie.
    
After seven years teaching at Royal College of Music de London, Jérôme Pernoo was appointed professor of cello at the Paris Conservatory of Music and Dance in 2005.

He is also the creator and artistic director of the festival Les Vacances de Monsieur Haydn, located at La Roche-Posay, of which the first edition took place in September 2005.

In 2015, he created the "Centre de musique de chambre de Paris", in residence at the Salle Cortot in Paris.

He plays Italian anonymous 18th century baroque cello and piccolo cello, school of Milan, as well as a modern cello made for him by Franck Ravatin.

Discography 
 1998 - J.S. Bach - Six Suites a Violoncello solo senza Basso (Ligia Digital)
 2002 - Giovanni Battista degli Antonii/Domenico Gabrielli - 12 Ricercate op. 1 for Cello Solo / 7 Ricercari for Cello Solo (Ogam)
 2002 - Sergei Rachmaninoff/Frank Bridge - Sonata for Cello & Piano Op. 19 / Sonata for Cello & Piano, 4 Pieces for Cello & Piano - with Jérôme Ducros (Ogam)
 2006 - Camille Saint-Saëns - Cello concerto n° 2 Op. 119 - with the Orchestre de Bretagne, under the direction of Nicolas Chalvin (timpani)
 2006 - Jacques Offenbach - Grand Concerto for Violoncelle and Orchestra - Concerto "Militaire" - with Les Musiciens du Louvre, under the direction of Marc Minkowski (Archiv-Deutsche Grammophon)
 2008 - Jacques Offenbach - Duets for cellos - with Raphaël Chrétien (Ligia Digital)
 2009 - Ludwig van Beethoven - Kreutzer sonata (transcription by Carl Czerny) ; Sonata Op. 69 ; Variations on The Magic Flute - with Jérôme Ducros (Ligia Digital)
 2011 - Guillaume Connesson - chamber music - with Jérôme Ducros (piano), Sergey Malov (violin), Ayako Tanaka (violin), Lise Berthaud (viola), Florent Héau (clarinet), (Collection Pierre Bergé)
 2013 -  - En aparté, Trio and Quintet with piano - with Jérôme Ducros (piano), Sergey Malov and Mi-Sa Yang (violins), and Gérard Caussé (viola), (Decca)
 2014 - Guillaume Connesson - Cello concerto - under the direction of Jean-Christophe Spinosi with the Monte-Carlo Philharmonic Orchestra (Deutsche Grammophon)

Books 
2009 - L'Amateur (publisher: Le Fond des Coulisses), out of print, 
2013 - L’Amateur, Lyon, Symétrie, 432 p.  read online

References

External links 
 Official website
 Jérôme Pernoo
  Le violoncelliste Jérôme Pernoo on France Inter (2 December 2015)
 Les 6 leviers du violoncelliste virtuose Jérôme Pernoo pour ouvrir la musique classique à tout le monde on Huffpost (5 October 2016)
 Jérôme Pernoo on Centre de musique de chambre de Paris
 Jérôme Pernoo on France Musique
 Jérôme Pernoo, direction artistique on "Les Vacances de Monsieur Haydn"
 Jérôme Pernoo - Kodály Cello Solo Sonata opus 8 on YouTube

1972 births
Musicians from Nantes
Living people
French classical cellists
Conservatoire de Paris alumni
Academic staff of the Conservatoire de Paris